DYVB-TV, channel 8, is a commercial television station owned by GMA Network Inc. Its transmitter are located at Circumferential Road, Poblacion, Borongan.

GMA TV-8 Borongan current programs
Balitang Bisdak - flagship regional newscast (simulcast over TV-7 Cebu)
GMA Regional TV Live! - flagship morning newscast (simulcast over TV-7 Cebu)

References

See also
 DYSS-TV
 List of GMA Network stations

GMA Network stations
Television channels and stations established in 1999
Eastern Samar